Walther Karl Paul Rethel (15 August 1892 – 1977) was a German aircraft designer born in Wesel.

Rethel was born to parents Paul Rethel (1855-1933) and Mally Rethel. His father was a Prussian Major General and grandfather was painter Otto Rethel.

Rethel was Chief Designer with German Kondor Flugzeugwerke (1912-1919) beginning in 1916 before working for the Dutch company Fokker in 1919 he joined NAVO Nederlandse Automobiel en-Vliegtuig Onderneming (Dutch Motorcar and Aircraft Co.) hired by Jan van der Eijken, where he developed the RK-P4/220 together with Karl Keidel. He designed aircraft such as the Kondor D series prototype fighters (1, 2 and 6), amphibious Fokker B.I and the Fokker F.VII airliner.  In the 1920s he worked for Arado Flugzeugwerke in Germany, before moving to Messerschmitt, where he was chief engineer on the legendary Bf 109.

References

1892 births
1977 deaths
Aircraft designers
Fokker
German aerospace engineers
Messerschmitt people
Date of death missing
Place of death missing
Engineers from Wesel